Anacithara maltzani is a species of sea snail, a marine gastropod mollusk in the family Horaiclavidae.

Description

Distribution
This marine species occurs in the Atlantic Ocean off Guinea

References

 Nolf F. & Swinnen F. (2011) Anacithara biscoitoi (Mollusca: Conoidea: Turridae), a new species from West Sahara (W Africa). Neptunea 10(2): 16–19

External links
 

maltzani
Gastropods described in 1952